Johan Palmquist is a retired Swedish sailor who won the world title in the Dragon class in 1973 and 1975. In 1975 he competed alongside his father Bengt and brother Björn.

References

Date of birth unknown
Living people
Swedish male sailors (sport)
Year of birth missing (living people)